The Shenyang J-16 (Chinese: 歼-16) is a Chinese advanced fourth-generation, tandem-seat, twinjet, multirole strike fighter developed from the Shenyang J-11 (itself derived from the Sukhoi Su-27) and built by Shenyang Aircraft Corporation. It is operated by the People's Liberation Army Air Force (PLAAF).

Design and development
In the 1990s, China purchased Sukhoi Su-27 air superiority fighters from Russia, including those license-produced in China as the Shenyang J-11A. The J-11A was further developed into the J-11B single seat and BS twin seat variant with indigenous technology. The J-16 is a strike aircraft derived from the J-11BS model.

The J-16 is equipped with an AESA radar and is powered by two Chinese Shenyang WS-10A turbofan engines. Weight is reduced through greater use of composite materials. J-16 units have received radar-absorbent paint to reduce its radar signature, and enhance its Suppression of Enemy Air Defenses (SEAD) capability in conjunction with electronic support measure pods.

The cockpit is fitted with helmet-mounted display (HMD) system to improve pilot’s situational awareness.

The electronic warfare version of the fighter, named J-16D, was developed in 2010s. The aircraft reportedly made its first flight in 2015. J-16D is designed to suppress enemy air defenses (SEAD), capable of housing internal jamming equipment and carrying various external electronic warfare pods.

According to aviation researcher Justin Bronk of the Royal United Services Institute, J-16 holds advantages over Russian Flanker variants with its wide application of composite materials, longer range missiles, advanced sensors, and avionics. J-16 represents a transition by the Chinese aviation industry away from a past dependence on Russian technology towards developing modern derivatives that are superior to the Russian originals in many aspects.

The Chinese military is developing advanced autonomous capabilities for its combat aircraft. In March 2021, it was reported that a J-16 variant with the backseat co-pilot replaced by an artificial intelligence algorithm called "intelligence victory" was undergoing testing at Shenyang Aircraft Corporation. A similar aircraft was also spotted by satellite image at an experimental test base near Malan, Xinjiang in June 2021.

Operational history

The first flight is believed to have occurred in 2011-2012.

In April 2014, the PLAAF received a regiment of J-16s.

The J-16 entered service in 2015 and was officially revealed in 2017 during the People's Liberation Army's 90th anniversary parade.

In 2021, Chinese Air Force began inducting J-16D in combat training.

According to the Australian Department of Defence, on 26 May 2022 a J-16 intercepted a RAAF P-8 Poseidon surveillance aircraft over the South China Sea while the latter was conducting routine maritime surveillance operations over international waters. The newly elected Australian defence minister Richard Marles said that the J-16 first flew closely alongside the P-8, released flares and then flew in front of the P-8 where it released chaff into the flight path of which some were ingested by the P-8's engine. The Australian Government lodged a protest with the Chinese Government over the incident and Marles said that Australia would not be deterred from conducting operations of the same or a similar nature in the future. According to a Chinese defense ministry spokesman, the Australian pilots acted "dangerously and provocatively," and ignored repeated warnings before the J-16 drove the Australian aircraft away. An article by the Lowy Institute, an Australian thinktank, said the interception marked an escalation in the grey zone actions that China was using to enforce its claims in the South China Sea.

Out of all aircraft deployed in the Taiwan strait, J-16 fighters are the most frequently used, possibly due to its electronic warfare capabilities. In August 2022, China dispatched large amount of J-16 fighters to the Taiwan strait, in response to the Nancy Pelosi’s Taiwan visit.

Variants

J-16
J-16D: Electronic warfare (EW) variant. Equipped with wingtip EW pods; internal EW system replaces IRST and 30 mm cannon. Reportedly first flew in December 2015.

Operators

People's Liberation Army Air Force – 245+ aircraft as of 2022

Specifications

EW pods(J-16D)

See also

References

Citations

Bibliography

 

2010s Chinese fighter aircraft
Shenyang aircraft
Electronic warfare aircraft
Twinjets
Fourth-generation jet fighter